Pterygodium is a genus of flowering plants from the orchid family, Orchidaceae. It found primarily in southern Africa (South Africa, Lesotho, Eswatini) but one species is endemic to Tanzania.

Species accepted as of June 2014:

Pterygodium acutifolium Lindl. - Cape Province
Pterygodium alatum (Thunb.) Sw. - Cape Province
Pterygodium caffrum (L.) Sw. - Cape Province
Pterygodium catholicum (L.) Sw. - Cape Province
Pterygodium cleistogamum (Bolus) Schltr. - Cape Province
Pterygodium connivens Schelpe - Cape Province
Pterygodium cooperi Rolfe in W.H.Harvey & auct. suc. - Cape Province, Kwazulu-Natal, Lesotho
Pterygodium cruciferum Sond. - Cape Province
Pterygodium hallii (Schelpe) Kurzweil & H.P.Linder - Cape Province
Pterygodium hastatum Bolus - Cape Province, Kwazulu-Natal, Lesotho, Free State, Mpumalanga, Eswatini
Pterygodium inversum (Thunb.) Sw. - Cape Province
Pterygodium leucanthum Bolus - Cape Province, Kwazulu-Natal, Lesotho
Pterygodium magnum Rchb.f. - Cape Province, Kwazulu-Natal, Free State, Mpumalanga
Pterygodium newdigatae Bolus - Cape Province
Pterygodium pentherianum Schltr. - Cape Province
Pterygodium platypetalum Lindl. - Cape Province
Pterygodium schelpei H.P.Linder - Cape Province
Pterygodium ukingense Schltr. - Tanzania
Pterygodium vermiferum E.G.H.Oliv. & Liltved - Cape Province
Pterygodium volucris (L.f.) Sw. - Cape Province

See also
 List of Orchidaceae genera

References

External links
 
 

Coryciinae
Orchideae genera
Orchids of Africa